Prochownik's Dream is a 2005 novel by the Australian author Alex Miller.  In this new novel the double Miles Franklin Award winner dramatises the dichotomy within an artist as he negotiates the creative life.' - Jane Sullivan, 'The Age'.

Notes

Dedication: "For Stephanie.  For the memory of Max Blatt. "
Epigraph: "'We cannot arbitrarily invent projects for ourselves: they have to be written in our past as requirements" (Simone de Beauvoir)

Awards

 2006 Longlisted, Miles Franklin Literary Award
 2005, FAW Melbourne University Publishing Award, highly commended

Interviews

 Jane Sullivan, 'The Miller's Tale, "The Age", 5 November 2005 
"Books and Writing"

Reviews

"The Age" 
"AussieReviews" 

Novels by Alex Miller
2005 Australian novels
Novels about artists